Daniel Robert Young (born 3 October 1990) is an English former first-class cricketer.

Young was born at Newcastle upon Tyne in October 1990. He was educated in the city at the Royal Grammar School, before going up to Leeds Metropolitan University. While studying at Leeds, Young played first-class cricket for Leeds/Bradford MCCU, making his debut against Yorkshire in 2013. He made two further first-class appearances for Leeds/Bradford, with a further match in 2013 against Leicestershire, before playing against Yorkshire in 2014. He scored 31 runs in his three matches, with a high score of 14. Young played minor counties cricket for Northumberland from 2011 to 2014, making fifteen appearances in the Minor Counties Championship and seven appearances in the MCCA Knockout Trophy.

References

External links

1990 births
Living people
Cricketers from Newcastle upon Tyne
People educated at the Royal Grammar School, Newcastle upon Tyne
Alumni of Leeds Beckett University
English cricketers
Northumberland cricketers
Leeds/Bradford MCCU cricketers